Edward Donnelly (July 29, 1879 – November 28, 1957) was an American pitcher in Major League Baseball who played from 1911 to 1912 for the Boston Rustlers / Braves.

External links
, or Retrosheet

1879 births
1957 deaths
Baltimore Orioles (IL) players
Baseball players from New York (state)
Boston Braves players
Boston Rustlers players
Kingston Colonials players
Major League Baseball pitchers
Newark Indians players
People from Hampton, New York
Syracuse Stars (minor league baseball) players
Troy Trojans (minor league) players